Siva Michael Kaneswaran (born 16 November 1988) is an Irish singer best known for being a member of the boy band The Wanted.

Early life 
Kaneswaran grew up in Corduff Blanchardstown, Dublin with a Sri Lankan Tamil father and an Irish mother. He has a twin brother Kumar, and six other siblings. Kaneswaran started modelling at 16 and appeared in various ads and landed a contract with Storm Model Management. Kaneswaran took part in Rock Rivals, televised in eight episodes between 17 March and 23 April 2008. His brother took part as well. Kaneswaran played the role of Carson Coombs and his brother that of Caleb Coombs. The brothers also appeared briefly in one episode of Uncle Max. The episode "Uncle Max Plays Tennis" aired on 11 July 2008. Kaneswaran was spotted through his modelling campaigns and subsequently recruited for the band. He is the younger brother of former Dove member and former Popstars: The Rivals contestant Hazel Kaneswaran.

Music career 
In 2009, Siva was selected from thousands of auditions to be a member of the Wanted. Originally managed by Jayne Collins and signed to Geffen Island Mercury.
They were then signed worldwide to Universal Music subsidiaries Island Records and Mercury Records, and managed by Scooter Braun. The band's debut album, The Wanted, was released on 25 October 2010 and peaked at number four on the UK Albums Chart. Their second number-one hit, "Glad You Came", topped the singles chart in the United Kingdom for two weeks, and in Ireland for five weeks. In early 2012, the Wanted's hit single "Glad You Came" sold 3 million copies in the US and hit number three on the US Billboard Top 100 Chart and number two on the Canadian Hot 100. Their follow-up singles "Chasing the Sun" and "I Found You" reached the top spot on the Billboard Hot Dance Club Songs chart. Siva has co-written several songs for the Wanted including "Say It on the Radio", "I Want It All" from their second album Battleground, and "Demons" from their third album Word of Mouth. In 2014 the Wanted announced their hiatus.

In 2015, Kaneswaran made an appearance in Dash Mihok and his band's, Diz and the Fam, music video for their single "Love". Towards the end of 2014, Kaneswaran did another tour with the Wanted in Mexico.

In 2016, Kaneswaran wrote the song "You're Not Alone" for the Eurovision Song Contest 2016 sung by Joe and Jake. In 2017, Kaneswaran won the first series of Celebrity Hunted with bandmate Jay McGuiness.

In September 2019, Kaneswaran released his debut solo single, "Breathe In". In November 2020, Kaneswaran released another single, "Ready For This Love" In September 2021, another solo single, "Syrup" was released

In 2023, Kaneswaran was a contestant on the fifteenth series of Dancing on Ice.

Other ventures 
Kaneswaran was signed to Storm Model Management at the age of 16 and the face of several international campaigns. Kaneswaran has been featured in several fashion magazines, including British Vogue, Cosmopolitan and Esquire.

In 2013, Kaneswaran was signed to Next Model Management.

When Siva signed with Storm Model Management in the UK, he soon began acting in Rock Rivals & Uncle Max.

In 2015, Kaneswaran signed with Agency for the Performing Arts and Untitled Management.

Personal life 
Kaneswaran became engaged to be married to luxury shoe designer Nareesha McCaffrey in 2013.

The New York Times mentioned that Kaneswaran invested in tech start-up The Muse.

He teamed up with Dash Mihok to support the Tourette Syndrome Association. He is also a supporter of Girl2B, an organization in Kolkata, India that provides a safe haven for homeless girls to live and grow.

In 2013, Kaneswaran starred in the E! channel reality series The Wanted Life.

Discography

Filmography 
2006 Uncle Max – Siva Kaneswaran
2008 British Rock Rival – Carson Coombs
2013 The Wanted Life – Siva Kaneswaran

References

Irish people of Sri Lankan descent
Irish pop singers
People from Fingal
1988 births
Living people
The Wanted members